The grands caids were Berber feudal rulers of southern quarter of Morocco under the French Protectorate.

References

French Morocco